was a Japanese swordsman.

His father, Gosho Motoharu, is one of the more important master of koryū budō of the region, being Menkyo kaiden and Shihan (master) of two important schools, the Hyōhō Niten Ichi-ryū and the Sekiguchi Ryū.

Since his youth, Yoshimoti Kiyoshi practiced budō under his father's care, reaching Menkyo Kaiden in both Hyōhō Niten Ichi ryū and Sekiguchi Ryū.

In 2007, attending to a request of the Ōita Kendo Association, the Kiyonaga family, the family of the late 9th soke of the Hyōhō Niten Ichi ryū (Kiyonaga Tadanao) and of the 11th successor (Kiyonaga Fumiya), chose Kiyoshi Yoshimoti to reestablish the main line of this school in Ōita. He became the 12th successor of Miyamoto Musashi, reintegrating his family line, the Gosho-ha Hyoho Niten Ichi ryu and the Seito line.

References

External links

 Official site of Hyoho Niten Ichi Ryu Seito (Oita)

1948 births
2020 deaths
Japanese kobudoka